Iddings-Gilbert-Leader-Anderson Block is a row of five connected historic commercial buildings located at Kendallville, Noble County, Indiana.  The block was built between 1891 and 1895, and is a two-story, red brick building with pressed metal facades in the Queen Anne style.

It was listed on the National Register of Historic Places in 1987.  It is located in the Kendallville Downtown Historic District.

References

Commercial buildings on the National Register of Historic Places in Indiana
Queen Anne architecture in Indiana
Commercial buildings completed in 1895
Buildings and structures in Noble County, Indiana
National Register of Historic Places in Noble County, Indiana
Historic district contributing properties in Indiana